Peter Alexander Gibson (born 22 May 1975) is a British politician who has served as the Member of Parliament (MP) for Darlington since the 2019 general election. He is a member of the Conservative Party.

Early life and career 
Gibson was born in Middlesbrough, North Yorkshire, to parents Alexander Francis Gibson and Anita Gibson (née Popple). He grew up in Saltburn-by-the-Sea, attending the town's Huntcliff Secondary School and then Sir William Turner's Sixth Form College in Redcar. He studied law at the University of Newcastle, graduating with an LLB in 1997. In 2000, he gained a Postgraduate Certificate in Legal Practice from the College of Law in York.

Gibson worked for Corries Solicitors in York from 1998 onwards: he was admitted as a solicitor in 2001, and stayed with the firm in that role until 2005. That year, he joined Minster Law Solicitors in York, and worked as a solicitor for them until 2006.

Prior to being elected as an MP, he worked as a solicitor specialising in personal injury litigation: he was the Principal Solicitor and Managing Director of Coles Solicitors in Northallerton from 2006 to 2019. After selling Coles Solicitors, he was a Managing Director of Kingly Solicitors in London for several months, resigning on the day of the 2019 general election.

He voted Remain in the 2016 Brexit referendum. Gibson is a member of the Rotary Club of Northallerton Mowbray, and became a Paul Harris Fellow of Rotary International in 2019.

Parliamentary career 
Gibson was previously the Conservative parliamentary candidate for Redcar in 2017. He was defeated by Labour incumbent Anna Turley, but increased the Conservative share of the vote by 17%, bringing them from fourth to second place in the constituency.

Gibson defeated Labour's shadow Brexit minister Jenny Chapman at the 2019 general election, taking the seat for the Conservatives for the first time in 27 years and securing a majority of over 3,000.

Gibson used his maiden speech in the House of Commons to advocate several constituency issues. During his first nine months as an MP representing Darlington, Gibson has been involved with a number of local projects. In an article published in a regional newspaper, The Northern Echo, Gibson said: "I've spoken with the head of every school and college, and have launched the Darlington Debates competition in conjunction with the amazing Darlington Rotary Club. I've hosted Zoom calls for Scouts, helped pack bags, organised and participated in numerous litterpicks, helped establish the new Friends of North Cemetery and attended their first clean up, and I've lobbied Network Rail to smarten up its bridges which serve as a gateway to our town."

In Parliament, he was a member of the Women and Equalities Committee from March 2020 to June 2021. In March 2020, Gibson said that he took a train journey home while suffering suspected Coronavirus, posting a message on his Facebook page saying: "When it was suspected that I had covid I was advised to travel home and isolate in my home, undertaking a 250 mile journey from London."

In October 2020, as part of a protest organised by some Darlington residents, empty plates and teddy bears were placed outside his constituency office after he voted against a Labour Party Opposition Day Motion to extend free school meals over holidays.

On 6 July 2022, he resigned as Parliamentary Private Secretary in the Department for International Trade in protest at Boris Johnson's conduct in the Chris Pincher scandal. His resignation letter criticised "the damage our party has inflicted on itself over the failure to include trans people in the ban on conversion therapy". In September 2022, he was reappointed to the Truss ministry as Parliamentary Private Secretary to the Cabinet Office.

Personal life 
Gibson entered into a civil partnership with Gareth Wedgwood Dadd in 2008. Dadd is deputy leader of North Yorkshire County Council.

Gibson lists his recreations as travel and cinema: he is a member of Easingwold and District Cinema Club.

References

External links

UK MPs 2019–present
1975 births
Living people
Conservative Party (UK) MPs for English constituencies
Alumni of Newcastle University
People from Darlington
Gay politicians
English LGBT politicians
LGBT members of the Parliament of the United Kingdom